Utawala Football Club is an association football club based in Nakuru, Kenya. The club currently competes in the FKF Division One, and plays its home games at the Afraha Stadium.

References

External links

FKF Division One clubs
Football clubs in Kenya